The Granite Canyon Trail is a  long hiking trail in Grand Teton National Park in the U.S. state of Wyoming. The trail follows the length of Granite Canyon. Just over a mile before the junction with the Teton Crest Trail, the Open Canyon Trail intercepts this trail from the north. There are three different camping zones in the canyon which are available by permit.

See also
List of hiking trails in Grand Teton National Park

References

Hiking trails of Grand Teton National Park